Opheodrys aestivus, commonly known as the rough green snake, is a nonvenomous North American colubrid. It is sometimes called grass snake or green grass snake, but these names are more commonly applied to the smooth green snake (Opheodrys vernalis). The European colubrid called grass snake (Natrix natrix) is unrelated. The rough green snake is docile, often allowing close approach by humans, and seldom bites. Even when bites occur, they have no venom and are harmless.

Description

The rough green snake (Opheodrys aestivus) is bright green above and has a yellowish belly, affording it excellent camouflage in green vegetation and making them difficult to see in the wild even though they are relatively common in their habitat. It has keeled dorsal scales, which are arranged in 17 rows at mid-body.

Geographic range
The rough green snake ranges throughout the Southeastern United States, from Florida, north to coastal Maine, Indiana, and west to Central Texas. The snake is commonly found in the Piedmont and Atlantic coastal plain, but is not found in the higher elevations of the Appalachian Mountains. It is also found in northeastern Mexico, including the state of Tamaulipas and eastern Nuevo León.

Habitat and behavior
The preferred habitat of O. aestivus is moist meadows and woodlands, often near water. It is highly arboreal, frequently found climbing in low vegetation, and is also a good swimmer. However, it is often found on the ground as well. Unlike many snakes, it is largely diurnal. At night it is found coiled in the branches of trees. Preference is given to perches based upon distance from the shoreline, height of branches, and thickness of the individual branch.

Diet
The diet of O. aestivus consists mostly of insects and other terrestrial arthropods, but some snails and tree frogs are eaten as well. This snake is not a constrictor; most prey are grabbed and simply swallowed alive. O. aestivus has been shown to rely heavily on visual cues for prey detection and to prefer living prey items. As foraging activity increases, the
tongue evolves greater elongation and deeper forking, and the abundance of chemoreceptors increases in the vomeronasal organs, the chemosenory responsiveness is adjusted to match diet and orthopterans constitute 16.9% and all arthropods about 98% of dietary volume of the rough green snake. Rough green snakes exhibit greater chemosensory investigation of chemical cues from their insect prey than from representatives of several other taxa because of the linked importance of insects to their diet.

Predation
Predators of the rough green snake include birds and other snakes, such as the eastern racer (Coluber constrictor) and the eastern king snake (Lampropeltis getula). They can also be infected by parasites including the Cryptosporidium species.  The rough green snake also does not exhibit any predator-resistance capabilities besides fleeing. They often undergo a lot of stress due to human presence.

Reproduction
The male rough green snake reaches sexual maturity at an age of 2 around 245 mm long. For the male, plasma androgen levels and the diameter of the sexual segment of the kidney 
have a bimodal cycle with one peak in the spring and the second in late summer. Spermatogenesis occurs in June, reaching its peak in July and August. This is a post-nupital cycle. The rough green snake breeds in spring, and sometimes again in fall. Courtship behavior expressed by males include head-jerking, tail waving, and chin-rubbing. Males align copulatory organs with females in an average of 2 minutes and 45 seconds, and copulation averages 16 minutes and 4 seconds. Females lay 2-14 eggs, occasionally in a communal nest shared by more than one female. Up to 75 eggs have been found in one such nest. The nest site varies: under boards, under bark in rotting stumps, in deep mulch, or under a rock. Male rough green snakes reach sexual maturity in two years. At maturity, males begin storing abundant amounts of sperm in their vas deferens. They are able to mate in the spring of the next year (year 3 of life).

Conservation status
The rough green snake is widespread and is not of conservation concern, in general. However, urban development, especially the reduction of vegetation near waterways, may reduce their numbers. Many are killed on roads, and they may be susceptible to poisoning by pesticides used on their insect prey. When dead, they turn blue. It is also one of the most exploited pet snakes in North America. O. aestivus are collected by the hundreds each year.

Subspecies
Opheodrys aestivus aestivus  – northern rough green snake
Opheodrys aestivus carinatus  – Florida rough green snake

References

External links and further reading
Aardema et al. Amphibians and Reptiles of North Carolina—accessed 29 May 2006
Conant, Roger et al. (1998). A Field Guide to Reptiles and Amphibians of Eastern and Central North America. Third Edition. Boston: Houghton Mifflin. .
Cook, Will. Carolina Nature—accessed 29 May 2006.
Gibbons, Whit, Michael E. Dorcas (2005). Snakes Of The Southeast. Athens, Georgia: University of Georgia Press. .
Linnaeus, C. (1766). Systema naturæ per regna tria naturæ, secundum classes, ordines, genera, species, cum characteribus, differentiis, synonymis, locis. Tomus I. Editio Duodecima, Reformata [Twelfth Edition, Revised]. Stockholm: L. Salvius. 532 pp. (Coluber æstivus, new species, p. 387.) (in Latin.)
Martof et al. (1980). Amphibians and Reptiles of the Carolinas and Virginia. Chapel Hill: University of North Carolina Press. .
Myers, P., R. Espinosa, C.S. Parr, T. Jones, G.S. Hammond, and T.A. Dewey (2006). Animal Diversity Web. Accessed May 29, 2006.
Palmer, William M., Alvin L. Braswell, Renaldo Kuhler (1995). Reptiles of North Carolina. Chapel Hill: University of North Carolina Press. .
Powell, Robert, Roger Conant, Joseph T. Collins (2016). Peterson Field Guide to Reptiles and Amphibians of Eastern and Central North America, Fourth Edition. Boston and New York: Houghton Mifflin Harcourt. xiv + 494 pp., 47 plates, 207 figures. . (Opheodrys aestivus, p. 382 + Plate 35).
Schmidt, K.P., and D.D. Davis (1941). Field Book of Snakes of the United States and Canada. New York: G.P. Putnam's Sons. 365 pp. (Opheodrys aestivus, pp. 118–120, Figure 27. + p. 332, Plate 12.)
University of Georgia, Savannah River Ecological Laboratory, Animal Fact Sheets—accessed 1 June 2006
University of Georgia, Savannah River Ecological Laboratory, Reptiles and Amphibians of South Carolina and Georgia—accessed 1 June 2006
Wright, A.H., and A.A. Wright (1957). Handbook of Snakes of the United States and Canada. Ithaca and London: Comstock. 1105 pp. (in 2 volumes) (Opheodrys aestivus, pp. 551–555, Map 43., Figure 164.)

Opheodrys
Reptiles described in 1766
Taxa named by Carl Linnaeus
Fauna of the Eastern United States
Fauna of the Southeastern United States
Reptiles of the United States
Reptiles of Mexico